Rafat Albdr (born July 8, 1978) is an Iraqi music director and producer, founder, and CEO of Music Al Remas TV.

Filmography

Discography

Studio albums 
2008: la la
2009: wenaak
2011: bs laa
2015: ashbk
2016: ared ahdnak
2016: shasawy
2017: welak lali
2017: aenta baas

Live albums 
2009: wenaak
2015: ashbk
2016: shasawy
2017: taela
2017: malak anfasi

References 

Living people
1978 births
Iraqi directors
Iraqi producers
Iraqi businesspeople
Music video directors